The 2008 James Madison Dukes football team represented James Madison University in the 2008 NCAA Division I FCS football season. JMU finished the season 12–2 with an undefeated record of 8–0 in the Colonial Athletic Association.

Schedule

References

James Madison
James Madison Dukes football seasons
Colonial Athletic Association football champion seasons
James Madison Dukes football